Tiffany Simelane (1988 – August 17, 2009) was a beauty queen who represented Swaziland in Miss World 2008 in South Africa. Her reign began on July 26, 2008, and ended 22 days before she died.

Miss Swaziland
After being crowned Miss Swaziland she complained to her friend that as soon as she won she was told she would have to pay all her expenses herself, including the cost of her dress, to travel to the Miss World pageant. This was a great sticking point between her and the contest sponsors and organizers. The organizers reported their own disappointments with Simelane, disclosing that she would "disappear without a trace", causing more controversy. In an interview with the Times of Swaziland she thanked God that her reign was over, stating she thought she was "going crazy" and that the title had been nothing more than a liability to her. When she relinquished her crown at a ceremony in the Royal Swazi Convention Centre, she gave a cryptic speech, revealing that becoming Miss Swaziland had opened her eyes and that she had hoped to remove the cloud of controversy around the competition during her reign. She then claimed that the competition was not being run in the correct fashion, but that her conscience was clear.

Death
On August 17, 2009, Simelane committed suicide by ingesting weevil tablet, a pesticide that contains aluminium phosphide and emits phosphine gas. She was rushed for treatment at the Mbabane Government Hospital. Friends reported that she killed herself over a "broken heart", facing depression and a lack of closeness with her family on top of the stress of being Miss Swaziland.

References

External links 

1988 births
2009 suicides
Suicides by poison
Suicides in Eswatini
Miss World 2008 delegates
Swazi beauty pageant winners